The Government agencies of Norway are state controlled organizations that act independently to carry out the policies of the Government of Norway. The Government Ministries are relatively small and merely policy-making organizations, allowed to control agencies by policy decisions but not by direct orders. A Minister is explicitly prohibited from interfering with the day-to-day operation in an agency or the outcome in individual cases. While no minister is allowed to give orders to agencies personally, they are subject to decisions made by the Government. Also, the Minister is normally the instance of appeals of agencies decisions.

Agencies are organised as etater. Still, some of the work of the government is carried out through state enterprises or limited companies. For a full list of enterprises and companies, see List of Norwegian government enterprises.

Storting

Office of the Auditor General of Norway, or Riksrevisjonen (auditor of all state accounts)
Norwegian Parliamentary Ombudsman for Public Administration, or Sivilombudsmannen (ombudsman for all civil matters)

Ministry of Agriculture and Food

Agencies
 County Governor, or Fylkesmannen Regional authority of the Government, with a Governor in each of 18 counties.
 Norwegian Agriculture Authority, or Statens landbruksforvaltning Authority for the agriculture industry.
 Norwegian Food Safety Authority, or Mattilsynet Controls all aspects of food safety, including agriculture, import and trade.
 Reindeer Husbandry Administration, or Reindriftforvaltningen Authority for the reindeer husbandry industry.

Enterprises
 Statskog Manages the state owned forests and natural property.

Limited companies
 Staur Farm, or Staur Gård A farm.

Ministry of Children and Equality

 Allocation Committee for support to voluntary children's and youth organizations, or Fordelingsutvalget for tilskudd til frivilligebarne- og ungdomsorganisasjoner Issues grants for children and youth organizations.
 County social welfare boards, or Fylkesnemndene for sosiale saker Makes decisions of placement of children in institutions and foster homes.
 Ecolabelling Norway, or Stiftelsen miljømerking Awards ecolabelling.
 County Governor, or Fylkesmannen Regional authority of the Government, with a Governor in each of 18 counties.
 Market Council of Norway, or Markedsrådet Makes juridical decisions concerning consumer rights upon specific or general cases.
 National Institute for Consumer Research, or Statens institutt for forbruksforskning Research.
 Norway's Contact Committee for Immigrants and the Authorities, or Kontaktutvalget mellom innvandrerbefolkningen og myndighetene Dialog between immigrants and authorities.
 Norwegian Assay Office, or Edelmetallkontrollen Control of trade of noble metals.
 Norwegian Consumer Council, or Forbrukerrådet Pursues consumer interests.
 Norwegian Consumer Dispute Commission, or Forbrukertvistutvalget Settles mater from consumers.
 Norwegian Consumer Ombudsman, or Forbrukerombudet Handles complaints from consumers.
 Norwegian Directorate for Children, Youth and Family Affairs, or Barne-, ungdoms- og familieetaten Helps children, youth and families who need help.
 Norwegian Equality and Anti-Discrimination Ombud, or Likestillings- og diskrimineringsombudet Fights discrimination.
 Norwegian Equality and Anti-Discrimination Tribunal, or Likestillings- og diskrimineringsnemnda Appeal board for the Equality and Anti-Discrimination Ombud.
 Norwegian Labour and Welfare Service, or Arbeids- og velferdsdirektoratet  Administrating age- and disability pensions and other welfare, and manages unemployment.
 Ombudsman for Children in Norway, or Barneombudet Promotes children's interests in society.

Ministry of Culture and Church Affairs

Agencies
 Arts Council Norway, or Norsk Kulturråd Issues grants to culture, and functions as an advisory board for the ministry in culture affairs.
 Bunad- og folkedraktrådet Gives advice about and stimulates the use of bunad, the Norwegian national costume.
 Det praktisk-teologiske seminar Educates ministers of the Church of Norway.
 Church of Norway National Council, or Kirkerådet Head body of the Church of Norway.
 Museum of Archaeology, Stavanger, or Arkeologisk museum i Stavanger Archeology and museum.
 National Archival Services of Norway, or Arkivverket National and regional state archives.
 National Foundation for Art in Public Buildings, or Utsmykkoingsfondet for offentlige bygg (official site) Competence centre and producer of art for public buildings.
 National Library of Norway, or Nasjonalbiblioteket National library.
 Nidaros Domkirkes Restaureringsarbeider Preservation work on the Nidaros Cathedral and the Archbishops Palace.
 Norwegian Library of Talking Books and Braille, or Norsk lyd- og blindeskriftbibliotek Publisher and library for audio books
 Norwegian Archive, Library and Museum Authority, or ABM-utvikling  Authority for archives, libraries and museums.
 Norwegian Film Institute, or Norsk filminstitutt Preserves, supports and distributes Norwegian and foreign films.
 Norwegian Gaming and Foundation Authority, or Lotteri- og stiftelsestilsynet Supervises gaming, lotteries and foundations.
 Norwegian Institute of Local History, or Norsk lokalhistorisk institutt Promotes local history knowledge.
 Norwegian Language Council, or Språkrådet Reguates the official version of the Norwegian language.
 Norwegian Media Authority, or Medietilsynet Regulates all aspects of mass media, including content rating, ownership, concessions and advertising.
 Opplysningsvesenets fond Manages the real estate of the Church of Norway, except the actual church buildings.
 Concerts Norway, or Rikskonsertene Mobile music performance that performs throughout the country.
 Riksteatret Mobile theatre that performs throughout the country.

Diocesan Councils
 Agder og Telemark Diocesan Council, or Agder og Telemark bispedømmeråd
 Bjørgvin Diocesan Council, or Bjørgvin bispedømmeråd
 Borg Diocesan Council, or Borg bispedømmeråd
 Hamar Diocesan Council, or Hamar bispedømmeråd
 Møre Diocesan Council, or Møre bispedømmeråd
 Nidaros Diocesan Council, or Nidaros bispedømmeråd
 Nord-Hålogaland Diocesan Council, or Nord-Hålogaland bispedømmeråd
 Oslo Bishop and Diocesan Council, or Oslo biskop og bispedømmerådråd
 Stavanger Diocesan Council, or Stavanger bispedømmeråd
 Sør-Hålogaland Diocesan Council, or Sør-Hålogaland  bispedømmeråd
 Tunsberg Diocesan Council, or Tunsberg bispedømmeråd

Limited companies
 National Theatre of Norway, or Nationaltheatret (official site) Theatre in Oslo.
 Norsk Tipping (official site) Holds a monopoly on all gambling.
 Norwegian Broadcasting Corporation, or Norsk rikskringkasting (official site) Public broadcaster of radio and television channels.

Ministry of Defence

 National Security Authority, or Nasjonal sikkerhetsmyndighet (official site)
 Norwegian Defence Estates Agency, or Forsvarsbygg (official site) Owns, operates and manages defence real estate.
 Norwegian Defence Research Establishment, or Forsvarets forskningsinstitutt (official site)

Norwegian Ministry of Education and Research

Agencies
 Foreldreutvalget for grunnskolen (official site) Cooperation between parents and school authorities.
 Norway Opening Universities, or Norgesuniversitetet (official site) Stimulates cooperation between business and higher education, and to increase lifelong learning.
 Norwegian Agency for Quality Assurance in Education, or Nasjonalt organ for kvalitet i utdanningen (official site) Supervises and helps improved the quality of higher education.
 Norwegian Centre for International Cooperation in Higher Education, or Senter for internasjonalisering av høyere utdanning (official site) Promotes international cooperation in higher education and research.
 Norwegian Directorate for Education and Training, or Utdanningsdirektoratetet (official site) Responsible for the development of primary and secondary education.
 Norwegian Institute for Adult Learning, or VOX-læring for arbeidslivet (official site) Promotes adult learning within reading, writing, arithmetic and ICT.
 Norwegian Institute of International Affairs, or Norsk utenrikspolitisk institutt (official site) Research.
 Norwegian Meteorological Institute, or Meteorologisk institutt (official site) Performs weather observations and calculations.
 Norwegian Social Research, or Norsk institutt for forskning om oppvekst, velferd og aldring (official site) Research.
 Norwegian State Educational Loan Fund, or Statens lånekasse for utdanning (official site) Grants loans and scholarships to students.
 Norwegian Universities and Colleges Admission Service, or Samordna opptak (official site) Coordinates admission to undergraduate courses at state universities and colleges.
 The Research Council of Norway Norges forskningsråd (official site) Grants funds for research.
  (official site) Educates gardeners and flower decorators at secondary school level.

Universities
Norwegian University of Life Sciences, or Universitetet for miljø- og biovitenskap (official site)
Norwegian University of Science and Technology, or Norges teknisk-naturvitenskapelige universitet (official site)
University of Agder, or Universitetet i Agder (official site)
University of Bergen, or Universitetet i Bergen (official site)
University of Oslo, or Universitetet i Oslo (official site)
University of Stavanger, or Universitetet i Stavanger (official site)
University of Tromsø, or Universitetet i Tromsø (official site)

Specialised Colleges
Oslo School of Architecture and Design, or Arkitektur- og designhøgskolen i Oslo (official site)
Norwegian School of Economics and Business Administration, or Norges handelshøgskole (official site)
Norwegian School of Sport Sciences, or Norges idrettshøgskole (official site)
Norwegian Academy of Music, or Norges musikkhøgskole (official site)
Norwegian School of Veterinary Science, or Norges veterinærhøgskole (official site)

Regional University Colleges
Akershus University College, or Høgskolen i Akershus (official site)
Bergen National Academy of the Arts, or Kunsthøgskolen i Bergen (official site)
Bergen University College, or Høgskolen i Bergen (official site)
Bodø University College, or Høgskolen i Bodø (official site)
Buskerud University College, or Høgskolen i Buskerud (official site)
Finnmark University College, or Høgskolen i Finnmark (official site)
Gjøvik University College, or Høgskolen i Gjøvik (official site)
Harstad University College, or Høgskolen i Harstad (official site)
Hedmark University College, or Høgskolen i Hedmark (official site )
Lillehammer University College, or Høgskolen i Lillehammer (official site)
Molde University College, or Høgskolen i Molde (official site)
Narvik University College, or Høgskolen i Narvik (official site)
Nesna University College, or Høgskolen i Nesna (official site)
Nord-Trøndelag University College, or Høgskolen i Nord-Trøndelag (official site)
Oslo National Academy of the Arts, or Kunsthøgskolen i Oslo (official site)
Oslo University College, or Høgskolen i Oslo (official site)
Sámi University College, or Samisk høgskole  (official site)
Sogn og Fjordane University College, or Høgskolen i Sogn of Fjordane (official site)
Stord/Haugesund University College, or Høgskolen i Stord/Haugesund (official site )
Sør-Trøndelag University College, or Høgskolen i Sør-Trøndelag (official site)
Telemark University College, or Høgskolen i Telemark (official site)
Tromsø University College, or Høgskolen i Tromsø (official site)
Vestfold University College, or Høgskolen i Vestfold (official site)
Volda University College, or Høgskolen i Volda (official site)
Østfold University College, or Høgskolen i Østfold (official site)
Ålesund University College, or Høgskolen i  (official site)

Limited companies
Norwegian Social Science Data Services, or Norsk samfunnsvitenskapelig datatjeneste (official site ) Information and data services for higher education and research.
University Centre in Svalbard, or Universitetssenteret på Svalbard (official site) Research on Svalbard.
UNINETT (official site) Operates the university/college/research internet communication network and the norid domain register.

Ministry of the Environment

Norwegian Directorate for Nature Management, or Directoratet for naturforvaltning (official site) Authority that authorises preservation of the natural environment, including nature preserves, national parks and predators.
Norwegian Directorate for Cultural Heritage, or Riksantikvaren (official site) Authority that authorises preservation of cultural heritage.
Norwegian Polar Institute, or Norsk Polarinstitutt (official site) Conducts research related to Arctic sciences.
Norwegian Mapping Authority, or Statens kartverk (official site) Manages maps of the entire country.
Norwegian Climate and Pollution Agency, or Klima- og forurensningsdirektoratet (official site) Authorises permits for pollution.
Norwegian Product Register, or Produktregisteret (official site) Maintains a database over the content of all products distributed in the country.

Ministry of Finance

 Pension Fund Global, or Statens pensjonsfond - utland (official site) (Invests axcess capital abroad)
 National Insurance Scheme Fund, or Folketrygdfondet (official site) (Invests pensions domestic)
 Norges Bank (official site) (Central bank)
 Norwegian Customs and Excise Authorities, or Tollvesenet (official site) Collects customs.
 Norwegian Financial Supervisory Authority, or Finanstilsynet (official site) Controls banks and other financial institutions.
 Norwegian Government Agency for Financial Management, or Senter for statlig økonomistyring (official site) Coordinates financial management within the Government.
 Norwegian National Collection Agency, or Statens innkrevingssentral (official site) Collects dues payable to the state.
 Norwegian Tax Administration, or Skatteetaten (official site) Manages and collects taxes.
 Statistics Norway, or Statistisk sentralbyrå (official site) Statistics collection, computing and publishing agency.

Ministry of Fisheries and Coastal Affairs

Agencies
 Institute of Marine Research, or Havforskningsinstituttet (official site) Research related to marine biology and fish management.
 Norwegian Coastal Administration, or Kystverket (official site) Owns and operates water transportation infrastructure, including harbours, piloting and navigation.
 National Institute of Nutrition and Seafood Research, or Nasjonalt institutt for ernærings- og sjømatforskning (official site) Research related to nutrition and seafood.
 Norwegian Directorate of Fisheries, or Fiskeridirektoratet (official site) Authority concerning matters of fisheries.

Limited companies
 Norwegian Seafood Export Council, or Eksportrådet for fisk (official site) Marketing of fish abroad.
 Secora (official site) (Construction company for water transport infrastructure)

Ministry of Foreign Affairs

 Fredskorpset (official site) Exchange organisation to create understanding between countries.
 Norfund (official site) Capital investment in developing countries.
 Norwegian Agency for Development Cooperation, or Norad (official site) Aid to developing countries.

Ministry of Government Administration and Reform

 Agency for Public Management and eGovernment, or Direktoratet for forvaltning og informasjons- og kommunikasjonsteknologi (official site) Management consulting, electronic commerce management and operation og government websites.
 County Governor, or Fylkesmannen (official site) Regional authority of the Government, with a Governor in each of 18 counties.
 Government Administration Services, or Departementenes servicesenter (official site) Provides administrative services for the ministries.
 Norwegian Competition Authority, or Konkuransetilsynet (official site) Regulates permission to merge, and regulates to stimulate competition.
 Norwegian Data Inspectorate, or Datatilsynet (official site) Regulates permission to store information on persons or other entities
 Norwegian Directorate of Public Construction and Property, or Statsbygg (official site) Builds, manages and operates all government buildings.
 Norwegian Public Service Pension Fund, or Statens pensjonsfond (official site) Fund allocating extra pensions for civil servants.
 Personvernnemda (official site) Ombudsman concerning matters of privacy.

Ministry of Health and Care Services

Agencies
 Norwegian Directorate for Health and Social Affairs, or Helse- og sosialdirektoratet (official site) Central expertise in administering healthcare and social affairs.
 Norwegian Board of Health Supervision, or Statens helsetilsyn (official site) Highest supervision authority for the health and social services.
 Norwegian Institute of Public Health, or Nasjonalt folkehelseinstitutt (official site) Preventative health work
 Norwegian System of Compensation to Patients, or Norsk pasientskadeerstatning (official site) Can issue compensation for mistreatment.
 Norwegian Patients' Injury Compensation Board, or Pasientskadenemnda (official site) Appeal board for the System of Compensation to Patients.
 Norwegian Biotechnology Advisory Board, or Bioteknologinamda (official site) A board that advises the authorities in matters concerning modern biotechnology.
 Norwegian Appeals Board for Health Personnel, or Statens helsepersonellnemnd (official site) Appeal board for health personnel who lose authorization.
 Norwegian Medicines Agency, or Statens legemiddelverk (official site) Controls research, production and sale of medicine.
 National Institute for Alcohol and Drug Research, or Statens institutt for rusmiddelforskning (official site) Research connected to alcohol and drug use.
 Norwegian Scientific Committee for Food Safety, or Vitenskapskomiteen for mattrygghet (official site)
 Norwegian Radiation Protection Authority, or Statens strålevern (official site) Expertise and precautions against nuclear and radiation threats.
 Norwegian Labour and Welfare Service, or Arbeids- og velferdsdirektoratet (official site) Administrating age- and disability pensions and other welfare, and manages unemployment.
 Norwegian Food Safety Authority, or Mattilsynet (official site) Controls all aspects of food safety, including agruculture, import and trade.
 Norwegian Governmental Appeal Board regarding medical treatment abroad, or Dispensasjons- og klagenemnda for behandling i utlandet (official site) Appeal board for patients who need treatment abroad, and where there is not adequate domestic service, who are entitled to get the treatment paid by the authorities.

Regional health authorities
The regional health authorities or regional helseforetak are responsible for providing specialist healthcare services within their designated geographic area.
 Central Norway Regional Health Authority, or Helse Midt-Norge (official site)
 Northern Norway Regional Health Authority, or Helse Nord (official site )
 Southern and Eastern Norway Regional Health Authority, or Helse Sør-Øst (official site)
 Western Norway Regional Health Authority, or Helse Vest (official site)

Limited companies
 Vinmonopolet (official site) Monopoly on trade of wine and spirits.

Ministry of Justice and the Police

Agencies
 Governor of Svalbard, or Sysselmannen på Svalbard (official site)
 Joint Rescue Coordination Centre of Northern Norway, or Hovedredningssentralen i Nord-Norge (official site) Coordinates rescue operations.
 Joint Rescue Coordination Centre of Southern Norway, or Hovedredningssentralen i Sør-Norge (official site) Coordinates rescue operations.
 Justissekretariatene (official site) Manages a number of administrative function related to the juridical processes.
 National Police Directorate, or Politidirektoratet (official site) The police force.
 National Security Authority, or Nasjonal sikkerhetsmyndighet (official site)
 Norwegian Advisory Council on Bankruptcy, or Konkursrådet (official site) Administrates bankruptcies.
 Norwegian Border Commissioner, or Grensekommisær for den norsk-russiske grense (official site) Controls the border between Norway and Russia.
 Norwegian Civil Defence, or Sivilforsvaret (official site) Civil defence; emergency and rescue services in the event of major accidents and incidents
 Norwegian Correctional Services, or Kriminalomsorgen (official site) Operates criminal correctional services, including the prisons.
 Norwegian Criminal Injuries Compensation Authority, or Kontoret for voldsoffererstatning (official site) Manages compensation to subjects of criminal injuries.
 Norwegian Directorate for Civil Protection and Emergency Planning, or Direktoratet for samfunnssikkerhet og beredskap (official site) keeps an overview of societies threats, and works to prevent.
 Norwegian Directorate for Emergency Communication, or Direktoratet for nødkommunikasjon (official site) Building and to operate the emergency communication network.
 Norwegian Judge Advocate General, or Generaladvokatembetet (official site) Head prosecutor of the military court.
 Norwegian Mediation and Reconciliation Service, or Konfliktrådet (official site) Settles disputes.
 Norwegian Police Security Service, or Politiets sikkerhetstjeneste (official site) Surveillance of domestic threats to national security.
 Norwegian Police University College, or Politihøyskolen (official site) Police officer college.
 Samerettsutvalget Research related to the Sami.
 Norwegian Bureau for the Investigation of Police Affairs, or Spesialenheten for politisaker (official site) Investigates accusations of criminal offences by police or prosecution officers in duty.

Limited companies
 Norsk Eiendomsinformasjon (official site) Land registry company, that provides land information to the professional market.

Ministry of Local Government and Regional Development

 Norwegian State Housing Bank, or Husbanken (official site) Issues loans for housing.
 National Office of Building Technology and Administration, or Statens bygningstekniske etat (official site) Expertise within building technology.

Ministry of Petroleum and Energy

Agencies
 Gassnova (official site) Research related to  capture and deposit.
 Norwegian Petroleum Directorate, or Oljedirektoratet (official site) Manages the petroleum resources on the Norwegian continental shelf.
 Norwegian Water Resources and Energy Directorate, or Norges vassdrag og energidirektorat (official site) Authority controlling and regulating water resources like rivers and lakes, and the production of energy.

Enterprises
 Enova (official site) Manages subsidies and encourages energy conservation.
 Statnett (official site) Owns and operates the central power grid.

Limited companies
 Gassco (official site) Operates all natural gas pipe lines in the country.
 Petoro (official site) Manages the State's Direct Financial Interest in the petroleum industry.

Ministry of Labour and Social Inclusion

Agencies
 International Centre for Reindeer Husbandry, or Internasjonalt fag- og formidlingssenter for reindrift (official site) Research.
 Labour Court of Norway, or Arbeidsretten (official site) Court that takes under consideration disputes about validity, interpretation and existence of collective agreements, questions regarding breach of collective agreements, questions regarding breach of the peace obligation, and claims for damages resulting from such breaches.
 Directorate of Integration and Diversity, or Integrerings- og mangfoldhetsdirektoratet (official site) Authority concerning integration of foreigners.
 National Centre for Documentation on Disability, or Nasjonal dokumentasjonssenter for personer med nedsatt funksjonsevne (official site) Research.
 National Institute of Occupational Health, or Statens arbeidsmiljøinstitutt (official site) Research.
 Norwegian Directorate for Health and Social Affairs, or Sosial- og helsedirektoratet (official site) Competence centre for the management of healthcare and social affairs.
 Norwegian Directorate of Immigration, or Utlendingsdirektoratet (official site) Immigration permits and authority.
 Norwegian Directorate of Labour and Welfare, or Arbeids- og velferdsdirektoratet (official site) Manages the Norwegian Labour and Welfare Service.
 Norwegian Immigration Appeals Board, or Utlendingsnemda (official site) Appeal board for the Directorate of Immigration.
 Norwegian Labour and Welfare Service, or Arbeids- og velferdsetaten (official site) Administering age- and disability pensions and other welfare, and manages unemployment.
 Norwegian Labour Inspection Authority, or Arbeidstilsynet (official site) Authority aimed at occupational health and safety.
 Norwegian Pension Insurance for Seamen, or Pensjonstrygden for sjømenn (official site) Administrates the seamen's pension.
 Petroleum Safety Authority Norway, or Petroleumstilsynet (official site) Insures occupational safety and health in the petroleum industry.
 Resource Centre for Nature and Reindeer Husbandry Services, or Ressurssenter for natur og reindriftstjenester Research.
 State Conciliator of Norway, or Riksmeklingsmannen (official site) Negotiates wage and traffic disputes between employer and labour unions.
 Sámediggi, or Sametinget (official site) Sami parliament.

Limited companies
 Rehabil (official site) Rehabilitation workplace.

Ministry of Trade and Industry

Agencies
 Brønnøysund Register Centre, or Brønnøysundregistrene (official site) Manages the vast amounts of registers related to business, commerce and civil matters.
 Guarantee Institute for Export Credits, or Garanti-instituttet for eksportkreditt (official site) Grants guarantees for export companies.
 Norwegian Accreditation, or Norsk Akkreditering (official site) Insures that research laboratories meet international regulations.
 Norwegian Directorate of Mining with the Commissioner of Mines at Svalbard, or Bergvesenet med bergmesteren for Svalbard (official site) Registers mining claims, and regulates other concerns regarding mining, including environmental issues and mining on Svalbard.
 Norwegian Maritime Directorate, or Sjøfartsdirektoratet (official site) Insures and encourages sea and water transport safety.
 Norwegian Metrology Service, or Justervesenet (official site) In charge of research and measuring of metrology; insures through control that all meters measure correct.
 Norwegian Geological Survey, or Norges geologiske undersøkelser (official site) Research and survey related to geology.
 Norwegian Industrial Property Office, or Patentstyret (official site) Registers patents
 Norwegian Ship Registers, or Skipsregistrene (official site) Registry for the Norwegian Ship Register and the Norwegian International Ship Register.
 Norwegian Space Centre, or Norsk Romsenter (official site) Space agency.

Limited companies
 Argentum Fondsinvesteringer (official site) Private Equity fund.
 Bjørnøen (official site) Owns all land on the island Bjørnøya.
 Electronic Chart Centre (official site) Makes electronic maritime charts.
 Entra Eiendom (official site) Manages the commercial portfolio of government real estate.
 Flytoget (official site) Operates the Airport Express Train between Oslo and Oslo Airport, Gardermoen.
 Innovation Norway, or Innovasjon Norge (official site) Provides help and funding for start-up companies
 Kings Bay (official site) Operates that research facility at Ny-Ålesund on Svalbard.
 Mesta (official site) Provides public tender road work construction work.
 Industrial Development Corporation of Norway, or SIVA (official site) Invests in business- and industry park, incubators and other industrial and technology entrepreneur infrastructure
 Statkraft (official site) Power company, that also owns a number of local power companies
 Venturefondet (official site) Investment fund.
 Store Norske Spitsbergen Kulkompani (official site) Operates the coal mine at Longyearbyen and Svea on Svalbard.

Ministry of Transport and Communications

Agencies
 National Rail Administration, or Jernbaneverket (official site ) Owns and operates the railway infrastructure.
 Norwegian Accident Investigation Board, or Statens havarikommisjon for transport (official site) Investigates accidents related to air-, water-, road- or rail transport.
 Norwegian Civil Aviation Authority, or Luftfartstilsynet (official site) Inspectorate and authority concerning air transport
 Norwegian Post and Telecommunications Authority, or Post- og teletilsynet (official site) Regulates the telecom industry, issues telephone numbers etc.
 Norwegian Railway Inspectorate, or Jernbanetilsynet (official site) Inspectorate concerning rail transport, including urban rail.
 Norwegian Public Roads Administration, or Statens Vegvesen (official site) Builds, operates and maintains state and county road infrastructure.

Limited companies
 Avinor (official site) Airport and air traffic management operator
 Baneservice (official site) Construction company for railway infrastructure
 Posten Norge (official site) Postal service
 Vy (official site) Railway operation

See also
 Politics of Norway
 List of government enterprises of Norway
 Government agencies in Iceland
 Government agencies in Sweden

 
Agencies
Norway
Lists of organisations based in Norway